Booze, Broads and Beelzebub is the second studio album by Norwegian heavy metal band Chrome Division. It was released on July 18, 2008, through Nuclear Blast. The band announced that they had finished recording the album on January 15, 2008, on their MySpace blog, and announced the title and the planned release date on May 14, 2008, which was picked up on by heavy metal news sources. The album took seven days to record at Studio Fredmann in Gothenburg, starting on January 7, 2008. Before either of the blog announcements, bassist Björn Luna said in an interview that Chrome Division's next album would be released on Nuclear Blast, explaining that the band have a three-album contract with the label, and Blabbermouth.net confirmed that the album would be released on Nuclear Blast.

Track listing 
 All Songs Written By Chrome Division, except where noted.
 "The Second Coming" – 1:02
 "Booze, Broads and Beelzebub" – 4:20
 "Wine of Sin" – 4:10
 "Raven Black Cadillac" – 4:22
 "Life of a Fighter" – 4:38
 "The Devil Walks Proud" – 3:50
 "Hate This Town" – 3:55
 "The Boys from the East" – 4:47
 "Doomsday Rider" – 3:46
 "Let's Hear It" – 4:55
 "Sharp Dressed Man" (ZZ Top cover) – 3:10 (ZZ Top)
 "Bad Broad (Good Girl Gone Bad)" – 4:12
 "Raise Your Flag" – 3:00

Personnel 
 Shagrath: Guitars
 Eddie Guz: Vocals
 Ricky Black: Guitars
 Luna: Bass
 Tony White: Drums

Production 
 Arranged & Produced By Chrome Division
 Recorded & Engineered By Fredrik Nordström; assistant engineers: Henrik Udd & Ricky Black
 Mixed By Shagrath, Fredrik Nordstrom & Henrik Udd
 Mastered By Peter in de Betou

External links 
 "Booze, Broad & Beelzebub" at discogs

References 

2008 albums
Chrome Division albums
Nuclear Blast albums